Aaron Aby is a Welsh professional martial artist and former footballer who represented Wales at youth level.

References

Date of birth missing (living people)
Living people
Welsh martial artists
Welsh footballers
Wales youth international footballers
Year of birth missing (living people)